The Clean Up is a 1923 American silent comedy film directed by William Parke and starring Herbert Rawlinson, Claire Adams, and Claire Anderson.

Plot
As described in a film magazine review, spendthrift Montgomery Bixby's grandfather leaves him only a dollar in his will and fifty thousand dollars in cash to each citizen of the little town in which he lived. His sweetheart jilts him, as the whole town goes money mad. Crooks arrive to get in on the "clean-up." Monte decides to save the people in spite of themselves, and he enlists the aid of his grandfather's former secretary. He succeeds and then finds out that the will was only a hoax intended to teach him the value of money, and that a real inheritance is waiting for him.

Cast

References

Bibliography
 Munden, Kenneth White. The American Film Institute Catalog of Motion Pictures Produced in the United States, Part 1. University of California Press, 1997.

External links

1923 films
1923 comedy films
Silent American comedy films
Films directed by William Parke
American silent feature films
1920s English-language films
American black-and-white films
Universal Pictures films
1920s American films